

Events 
Antonio Salieri is appointed court composer to the Emperor Joseph II.
Domenico Cimarosa is invited to Rome for the opera season.
Charles Burney writes A Plan for a Music School.
Pascal Taskin becomes keeper of the King's instruments.
Georg Joseph Vogler becomes a pupil of Giovanni Battista Martini at Bologna.

Opera 
Pasquale Anfossi – Olimpiade
Christoph Willibald Gluck 
Iphigenie en Aulide Wq.40
Orphée et Eurydice, Wq.41 (French revision of Wq. 30)
 Josef Mysliveček – Artaserse, ED.10:B.b5
 Giovanni Paisiello 
 Il duello comico, R.1.41
 La frascatana, R.1.43
 Antonio Salieri – La Calamita de’ cuori

Classical music 
Carl Friedrich Abel – 6 Keyboard Concertos, Op. 11
Johann Christian Bach – Symphony in B-flat major, W.B 17
Wilhelm Friedemann Bach – Keyboard Sonata in B-flat major, F.9
Josse-François-Joseph Benaut – Mass in C major
Ernst Eichner – 2 Harpsichord Concertos, Op. 5
Joseph Haydn 
Baryton Trio in D major, Hob.XI:34
Great Organ Mass
 Niccolò Jommelli – Pietà Signore, H.Anh.42
Wolfgang Amadeus Mozart 
Concertone in C major, K.190/186E
March in D major, K.237/189c
Symphony No. 29 in A
Joseph Bologne Saint-Georges 
2 Violin Concertos, Op. 3 (Paris: Bailleux)
2 Violin Concertos, Op. 4 (Paris: Bailleux)
Carl Stamitz 
Concerto for Viola No. 1 in D major
6 Quartets, Op. 4

Methods and theory writings 

 Martin Gerbert – De cantu et musica sacra
 Johann Adam Hiller 
 Anweisung zum musikalisch-richtigen Gesange
 Exempel-Buch der Anweisung zum Singen
 Heinrich Laag – Anfangsgründe zum Clavierspielen und Generalbas
 Georg Simon Löhlein – Anweisung zum Vionlinspielen
 Giovanni Battista Mancini – Pensieri e riflessioni pratiche sopra il canto figurato
 Giovanni Battista Martini – Esemplare, o sia Saggio fondamentale pratico di contrappunto
Johann Friedrich Reichardt – Briefe eines aufmerksamen Reisenden die Musik betreffend

Births 
February 16 – Pierre Rode, violinist, composer, (d. 1830)
March 5 – Christoph Ernst Friedrich Weyse, composer
April 17 – Václav Jan Křtitel Tomášek, organist and composer
October 7 – Ferdinando Orlandi, composer
October 23 – René de Chazet, librettist and writer (died 1844)
November 14 – Gaspare Spontini, composer
November 18 – William Horsley, composer
December 20 – Guillaume-Perre-Antoine Gatayes, composer

Deaths 
January 20 – Florian Leopold Gassmann, composer, 44
January 30 
Jean-Pierre Guignon, French composer (born 1702)
Frantisek Tuma, composer, 69 
July 1 (buried) – Wenceslaus Wodiczka, violinist and composer
July 7 – Giuseppi Maria Carretti, composer 
August 25 – Niccolò Jommelli, composer, 59
December 2 – Johann Friedrich Agricola, composer, 54

 
18th century in music
Music by year